Johnston Blakeley also spelled Johnston Blakely (October 1781 – October 1814) was an officer in the United States Navy during the Quasi-War with France and the War of 1812.  He is considered to be one of the most successful American naval officers of that period.

Biography
Blakeley was born near Seaforde, County Down, Ireland. Brought to the United States as a child in 1783, he graduated from the University of North Carolina at Chapel Hill, where he was a member of the Dialectic and Philanthropic Societies, in 1800, then joined the Navy and was appointed a Midshipman in 1800.

After service in  during the Quasi-War with France and command of  early in the War of 1812, Master Commandant Blakeley was appointed to command of the newly built sloop-of-war .

In 1814, he made a very successful cruise which in June included the sinking of HMS Reindeer. In September, in a similar action, Blakeley sunk . That month he also captured the mercantile brig Atalanta. Wasp was last heard of 9 October 1814 and is believed to have foundered in a gale.  Blakeley received the Thanks of Congress, a gold medal, and posthumous advancement to the rank of Captain for his last cruise.

Captain Blakeley was married, in December, 1813, to Miss Jane Hoope, the daughter of his father's old friend, Mr. Hoope, of New York; and has left an only daughter, who received one of the most noble and substantial and affecting tributes of national gratitude which has occurred in the history of this country. The legislature of North Carolina, on 27 December 1816, after prescribing the destination of the sword they had voted to Captain Blakeley, "Resolved, unanimously, That Captain Blakeley's child be educated at the expense of this State; and that Mrs. Jane Blakeley be requested to draw on the Treasurer of this State, from time to time, for such sums of money as shall be required for the education of the said child."

Namesakes

Ships
Three ships have been named  in Captain Blakeley's honor:

 , a new class of torpedo boat in 1904 for the United States Navy
 , a  during World War II 
   destroyer escort, later to be reclassified as a frigate, named for both Captain Johnston Blakely and Vice Admiral Charles Adams Blakely

Places
 Blakely, Georgia, county seat of Early County
 Blakely, Pennsylvania 
 Port Blakely, named by Charles Wilkes during the Wilkes Expedition of 1838-1842 
 Blakely Island, part of the San Juan Islands in Washington state

Also part of the San Juan Islands chain are a group of islands to which Wilkes bestowed the name "Wasp Islands" after the Wasp.  Their namesake, however, was not the same vessel commanded by Blakely, but an earlier , also a sloop-of-war, which was commissioned in 1807 and captured by the British in the early months of the War of 1812.

Other
 Capt. Johnston Blakely Elementary School in Bainbridge Island, Washington

See also
List of people who disappeared mysteriously at sea

References

External links
 Frost, John, "The Pictorial Book Of The Commodores; Comprising Lives Of Distinguished Commanders In The Navy Of The United States." Nafis & Cornish, New York, 1845
 

1781 births
1810s missing person cases
1814 deaths
American military personnel of the Quasi-War
Congressional Gold Medal recipients
Irish emigrants to the United States (before 1923)
People lost at sea
United States Navy officers
United States Navy personnel of the War of 1812